Masarik, Masařík,  Masárik,  Masarík is a Slovak surname derived from the occupation of mäsiar / masař, or butcher. People with this surname may also be referred as Masaryk, Czech-language form, and vice versa. Notable people with the surname include:

Ivan Masařík,  Czech biathlete
Juraj Masárik, Slovak footballer

See also

Occupational surnames
Slovak-language surnames